Margaret Eaton may refer to:

Margaret Eaton, Baroness Eaton (born 1942), British politician
Margaret O'Neill Eaton, American woman (wife of a United States Senator) involved in the "Petticoat affair"
Margaret Fernie Eaton (1871–1953), English artist